Aleksandr Vasilyevich Syomin (9 August 1943 – 14 October 2016) was a Soviet football player.

International career
Syomin played his only game for USSR on June 16, 1968, in a friendly against Austria (he was the team captain for the game).

References

External links
 Profile 
 

1943 births
2016 deaths
Footballers from Baku
Azerbaijani footballers
Soviet footballers
Soviet Union international footballers
FC Ararat Yerevan players
FC Kairat players
Association football defenders
Neftçi PFK players
Soviet Top League players